Scott Bottoms is an American far-right politician who is a Colorado state representative from Colorado Springs. A Republican, Bottoms represents Colorado House of Representatives District 15, which includes much of eastern Colorado Springs and Cimarron Hills in El Paso County. Bottoms has described himself as "anti-establishment."

Background
Bottoms, a United States Navy veteran, is the pastor of the Church at Briargate in Colorado Springs' Briargate neighborhood.

Political career 
In the first day of the 2023 legislative session, 8 Republicans in the state House voted Bottoms for Speaker of the House. The vote was ultimately unsuccessful.

Bottoms has a strong stance against abortion and transgender rights, calling them "demonic" throughout his campaign. He has also falsely claimed that during the January 6 attack of the Capitol, the FBI "lured" the rioters into the building.

Elections
In the 2022 Colorado House of Representatives election, Bottoms defeated his Democratic Party and Libertarian Party opponents, winning  56.76% of the total votes cast.

References

External links
 Legislative website
 Campaign website

21st-century American politicians
Living people
Republican Party members of the Colorado House of Representatives
Politicians from Colorado Springs, Colorado
American Protestant ministers and clergy
Year of birth missing (living people)
Southwestern Assemblies of God University alumni
 Denver Seminary alumni
Assemblies of God Theological Seminary alumni